El Mago (Spanish for "the magician") or Mago is a nickname given to:

 Pablo Hernandez (born 1985), Leeds United footballer
 Pablo Aimar (born 1979), Argentine retired footballer
 Guido Alvarenga (born 1970), Paraguayan former footballer
 Thiago Alcântara (born 1991), Spanish-Brazilian football player
 Javier Báez (born 1992), Puerto Rican Major League Baseball player
 Héctor Blondet (1947–2006), Puerto Rican basketball player
 Alberto Pedro Cabrera (1945-2000), Argentine basketball player
 Rubén Capria (born 1970), Argentine retired footballer
 Guillermo Coria (born 1982), Argentine tennis player
 Alcides Escobar (born 1986), Venezuelan Major League Baseball player
 Walter Gaitán (born 1977), Argentine retired footballer
 Enrique García (1912-1969), Argentine footballer
 Mágico González (born 1958), Salvadoran retired footballer
 Juan Martín Hernández (born 1982), Argentine rugby union player
 Pablo Hernández (footballer, born 1985), Spanish and Leeds United footballer
 Miguel Ángel Loayza (born 1940), Peruvian former footballer
 Sergio Markarián (born 1944), Uruguayan football coach
 Juan Mata (born 1988), Spanish footballer
 Alejandro Sabella (1954-2020), Argentine football manager and former player
 Franklin Salas (born 1981), Ecuadorian footballer
 Pedro Septién (1916-2013), Mexican sports broadcaster
 Sam Shepherd (basketball) (born 1953), American-born Venezuelan former basketball player
 David Silva (born 1986), Spanish and Real Sociedad footballer
 Vassilios Tsiartas (born 1972), Greek retired footballer
 Jorge Valdivia (born 1983), Chilean footballer

See also
 The Magician (nickname)
 La Maga (disambiguation), the feminine form of the phrase
 El brujo (disambiguation)
 The Wizard (nickname)

Nicknames
Lists of people by nickname